This is a list of educational institutions located in the district of Multan in Pakistan.

Schools

Private institutes & schools

AL-Falah misali high school (boys and girls), Budhla Sant, Multan 
Al-Hassan K.G. G & High School, O/S Khuni Burj, Multan
Allied School
Anmol School System, M.A Jinnah Road, Multan
Beaconhouse School System
Bilson Public School
Bloomfield Hall Schools System
Britain International Schools System
British Grammar School
British International Schools System
Cambridge International School System Mumtazabad, Multan
Dar-e-Arqam Schools 
Educator Gulgasht Colony, Multan
Evergreen Model High School Chowk Kutchery Multan
Exclusive School System (Boys and Girls) 7, Nashaman Colony, Multan
Govt Higher Secondary School Ghazipur, Jalalpur Pirwala, Multan
Grew Bent System (GBS), Multan
Government Primary School Haji pur M.A Jinnah Road, Multan 
Government Muslim High School (D.A.V. High School), Multan
Heaven Flower Public School New multan, Hassan abad
Iqbal English Model School, Kot Rab Nawaz Vehari Road, Multan
Iqra Suffat ul Atfal School for Boys and Girls Multan
Jinnah Highs School System, Multan
Khair ul Maarif School, Boson Road, Multan
La Salle Higher Secondary School, Multan
Lahore Grammar School
Lahore Grammar School for Boys, Multan
Laureate Boys Higher Secondary School, Ansar Colony, Shah Rukn-e-Alam, Multan
Laureates Cadet School, Multan
Leads Grammar Schools System, Babar Road, Kiri Jamandan, O/S Khuni Burj, Multan
Learner's Castle School, Multan
The Maktab School, Mehboob Colony, Daira Basti, Multan
Multan Cambridge School Qasim Bela Multan
Multan Excel Schools ( Boys and Girls) New Multan, Multan
Multan Public School and College, Multan
Muslim Public Higher Secondary School, Mumtazabad Multan
Nishat High School For Boys Lodhi Colony/Pir Khursheed colony
Noukhez Group of Schools, Multan
PakChina Educational Linguistics Corridor, AlNoor Plaza T Chowk Shah Ruckn-E-Alam Colony, Multan, Pakistan
Pakistan Vocational Training Centre, Multan
PakTurk International Schools and Colleges, Multan Campus
Peace International School
Radial Way Public School, Shafaat Colony, Al-Tamash Road, Multan
Roshan International School, 23-V block, New Multan
Shah war group of schools
Sony technical Institute, Institute of technical, Safety education and languages, Multan
The Convent School Systems Fareed Canal View, Qasim pur Colony, Multan
The Country School System
The Educators School Shah Rukn-e-Alam & Mumtazabad Campuses
The Multan Alma (High School), 7-km Khanewal Road, Multan
The Public School, Multan
The Smart School, Multan
Zamir Public School, Multan
Zavia School System, Near Goal Bagh Gulgasht Colony, Multan 
Zenabia Campus
Zenabia Foundation
Zenabia Juniors
Zenabia Public

Schools for girls
 Al-Hassan K.G. & Girls High School, Khuni Burj, Multan
 Al-Mushir Girls High School Chowk Shah Abbas Multan.
 Al Noor Group Of School Multan Chungi # 14
 ALI COMPUTER Institute In Multan Pakistan
 Bakhtawar Amin School of Nursing, Near Mattital Road, Multan
 Heaven Flower Public School (New Multan Street no. 21 Ho
 Lahore Grammar School for Girls, Multan
 Leads Grammar School, Babar Road, Kirri Jamndan, Multan
 Zavia School System For Girls, Near Goal Bagh Gulgasht Colony, Multan

Colleges

Private colleges
Mentor Visions Professional Graphics Institute, Multan 
INEX School of Fashion Design & Professional Study, Multan 
Bakhtawar Amin School of Nursing, Multan
Britain International College Network, Multan 
City Science College and Academy
Concordia Colleges, Multan
High Aim Girls Evening College Al- Mustafa Road Near Farooq Pura Chowk Multan
Ideal group of Colleges, New Multan
KIPS College Multan
Leadership College Multan
Multan Institute of Professional Studies, Multan (MIPS Multan)
Multan Public School and College
Muslim College of Science and Commerce
Nishat College of Science
Pakistan College of Science and Commerce
Prime Institute of Technology Multan
Punjab College Multan
Rise College Multan
SAKIMS College, Bosan Road, Multan
STAK College Shah Rukn e Alam colony Multan
Supreme Law College, Multan
Superior College Multan 
Swedish College of Technology Vehari Chowk, Multan
The Global College, 11/G Shah Rukn-e-Alam Colony, Multan
The National College, Tehsil Chowk, Bosan Road, Multan

Public
 Govt. High School, Lar Janubi
 Govt. High School, Sahu
 Govt. High School, Sikanderabad
 Govt. High School, Jalal Abad Shumali
 Govt. High School, Bohar
 Govt. High School, Feroze Pur
 Govt. High School, Rid
 Govt. High School, 8/MR
 Ibn-e-Qasim High School
 Govt. High School, 7/T
 Govt. High School, Chak No.1/MR
 Govt. High School, Sanbhal
 Govt. High School, Chak 4 Faiz
 Govt. High School, 2 Kot Mela Ram
 Govt. High School, Lutafabad
 Govt. Higher Secondary School, Sameeja Abad
 Govt. High School, Kot Gujran
 Govt. High School, Shujabad
 Govt. Girls High School, No.2 Shamsabad
 Govt. High School, Mardanpur
 Govt. High School, Basti Nau
 Govt. High School, Bhaini
 Govt. High School, Qadir Pur Lar
 Govt. Secondary School For Special Education for Boys (Hearing Impaired)
 Govt. Higher Secondary School, Lar
 Govt. High School, Gulzarpur
 Govt. High School, Lother
 Govt. High School, Aliwala
 Govt. High School, Hamid Pur Kanora
 Govt. High School, Khan Pur Marral
 Govt. High School, Kotli Nijabat
 Govt. High School, Tatepur
 Govt. High School Kirarwala
 Govt. High School, Sher Shah
 Govt. High School, Basti Mithu Shujabad
 Govt. High School, Rangeel Pur
 Govt. High School, Jhoke Lashkar Pur
 Govt. Higher Secondary School, Kot Mela Ram
 Govt. High School, Mattital 
 Bilson Public School
 Govt. Higher Secondary School, Jalalpur Pirwala
 Govt. High School, Ghazi Pur
 Govt. High School, Jalalpur Khakhi
 Govt. High School, Kotla Maharan
 Govt. High School, Mullan Faqir
 La Salle Higher Secondary School
 Govt. High School, Ganwen Shujabad
 Govt. High School, Saray
 Govt. High School, 18/MR
 Govt. High School, Toder Pur Shujabad
 Beaconhouse Public School, Boys Branch
 Govt. High School, Basti Jaleel
 Govt. High School, Basti Malook
 Govt. Higher Secondary School, Bahadar Pur
 Govt. High School, 69/M
 Govt. High School, Bumb Jalalpur Pirwala
 The Public School
 Govt. High School, Chak Jhallar Shujabad
 Govt. High School, Chak R.S Shujabad
 Govt. Higher Secondary School, Raja Ram, Teh. Shujabad
 Govt. High School, Juggowala
 Govt. High School, Punjabi Shujabad
 Govt. High School, Bagrain Shujabad
 Govt. High School, Khan Bela, Jalalpur Pirwala
 Govt. High School, Vaince Shujabad
 Govt. High School, Hayat Khan Wala
 Govt. High School, Talkot Shujabad
 Govt. High School, Traggarh
 Govt. High School, Kotla Chakar
 Govt. High School, Pounta Teh. Shujabad
 Govt. High School, Inayat Pur Jalalpur Pirwala
 Govt. High School, Havaili Lang
 Govt. High School, Khuja Shujabad
 Govt. High School, Allah Abad
 Govt. High School, Obawara Shumali
 Govt. High School, Jahan Pur
 Govt. Girls High School Kotli Nijabat
 Raza Shah Public School
 Govt. Girls High School, Military Form
 Govt. Girls High School, Sher Shah
 Govt. Girls High School, Qadir Pur Ran
 Govt. Girls Higher Secondary School, Tate Pur
 Govt. Girls High School, Chak 5-Faiz
 Govt. Girls High School, Ayazabad Maral
 Sultan Foundation Girls High School, Mumtazabad
 Govt. Girls High School, Jalalpur Pirwala
 Govt. Girls High School, Basti Nau
 Govt. Girls High School, Matotali
 Govt. Girls High School, Zarif Shaheed
 Govt. Girls High School, Sikandarabad
 Govt. Girls High School, Suraj Miani
 Govt. Girls High School, Kabooter Mandi
 Govt. Girls High School, Loother
 Pakistan Public Girls High School
 Govt. Girls Higher Secondary School, Shujabad
 Govt. Noor Jehan Girls High School, Ismailabad
 Govt. Girls Higher Secondary School, Chah Bohar Wala
 Govt. Girls High School, Haram Gate
 Govt. Girls Higher Secondary School, Piran Ghaib
 Govt. Islamia Girls High School, Daulat Gate
 Govt. Model Muslim Girls High School
 Govt. Girls Comprehensive Higher Secondary School, Gulgasht 
 Govt. Iqbal Girls High School, Hussain Agahi
 Govt. Girls High School, District Jail Road
 Sacred Heart Girls High School, Multan Cantt
 Govt. Girls High School, Willayatabad No.2
 Govt. Girls High School, Moon Light, New Multan
 Govt. Girls High School, New Central Jail
 Ali Garh Model Girls High School, Gulgasht
 Mustafa Shah Islamia Girls High School
 Govt. Girls High School, Budhla Sant
 Govt. Girls High School, Makhdum Rashid
 Govt. Girls High School, Lar
 Govt. Girls Nusrat-Ul-Islam High School, Multan Cantt
 Govt. Al-Hussain Isl. Secondary School, Muzaffarabad
 Govt. High School, Makhdum Rasheed
 Govt. Higher Secondary School, Qadir Pur Ran
 Multan Public School and College
 Govt. Millat High School, New Multan
 Govt. Nusrat-ul-Islam High School, Multan Cantt
 Govt. Samra Public High School
 Govt. Jame-ul-Aloom High School, New Multan
 Beaconhouse Public School for Girls
 Govt. Bokhari Public High School
 Govt. High School, Piran Ghaib
 Govt. M.A. Jinnah High School Qasimpur Colony
 Govt. Iqbal Secondary School
 Govt. Pakistan High School
 Govt. Higher Secondary School, Budhla Sant
 Govt. Higher Secondary School, Ailam Pur
 Govt. High School, Ayazabad Maral
 Noukhez Public High School, New Multan
 Govt. New Millat High School, Mumtazabad
 Govt. Islamia High School, Aam Khas Bagh
 Boys High School, Pakarab Fertilizer Ltd.
 Multan Gems High School For Girls
 Shahwar Model Girls High School, Jalilabad
 St. Mary’s Convent Girls Higher Secondary School, Multan Cantt
 Govt. Muslim High School
 Govt. Model High School, Shamasabad
 Govt. Model High School, Gulgasht Colony
 Govt. High School, Matotli
 Govt. Comprehensive School
 Govt. High School, Nawab Pur
 Govt. Islamia High School, Daulat Gate
 Govt. Islamia High School, Haram Gate
 Govt. C.T.M. High School, Ismailabad
 Govt. Atta Faiz-e-Aam High School
 Govt. Jauhar High School
 Govt. M.C High School, Rashid Abad
 Govt. Rafah-e-Aam High School
 Govt. Secondary School of Special Education for Hearing Impaired (Girls)
 Govt. Pilot Secondary School
 The Olive Tree School (for girls), Gulgasht Colony
 Gilson Public High School (for girls), New Multan
 Pak Turk International School & College
 Junaid Public High School (for boys), People Colony
 Govt. High School, Sabra Jalalpur Pirwala
 Muslim English Public Boys High School, 71-Mujtabad Canal View
 Govt. High School, Lal Pur
 Sibtain Highs English Medium High School, Shah Rukn-e-Alam
 Bahria Foundation High School, 26-Officers Colony
 Grammar High School, Multan Cantt
 Missali Junior Public Secondary School (Regd.)
 Kids Foundation School (for girls), Kachehry Road
 Premier Public School (for girls), Bosan Road
 Govt. Girls High School, Jal Wala
 Govt. Girls High School, Railway Gate, Shujabad

Colleges for Boys
 F.G. College for Boys, Multan Cantt.
 Government Emerson College Multan
 Govt. Alamdar Hussain Islamia College, Multan
 Govt. College, Civil lines, Multan
 Govt. College, Jalalpur Pirwala
 Govt. College, Makhdoom Rashid
 Govt. College, Qadirpur Ran
 Govt. College, Shujabad
 Govt. College for Elementary Teachers, Chungi No. 6, Multan
 Govt. College of Commerce, Azmat Wasti Road, Multan
 Govt. College of Commerce, Qasimpur Colony, Multan
 Govt. College of Commerce, Shujabad
 Govt. College of Science, Multan
 Govt. College of Technology, Multan
 Govt. Millat Degree College, Multan
 Govt. Walliat Hussain Islamia College, Multan
 Rise College of Science, Peer Khurshid Colony, Multan
 Institute of Cost and Management Accountants of Pakistan (ICMA Pakistan), Multan

Colleges for Girls
 F.G. College for Women, Multan
 Govt. College for Women, Chungi No. 6, Multan
 Govt. College for Women, Chungi No. 14, Multan
 Govt. College for Women, Jalalpur Pirwala
 Govt. College for Women, Kutchery, Multan
 Govt. College for Women, Makhdoom Rashid
 Govt. College for Women, Mumtazabad, Multan
 Govt. College for Women, Shah Rukn-e-Alam, Multan
 Govt. College for Women, Shujabad
 Govt. College of Home Economics, Multan
 Govt. Fatima Jinnah College for Women, Masoom Shah Road, Multan
 Govt. Zainab College for Women, Chowk Shaheedan, Multan
 Institute of Cost and Management Accountants of Pakistan. (ICMA Pakistan), Multan

Professional Education Centers
 BirdView Logic Academy (Software House and IT Training), Faisalabad
 INEX Institute ( INEX School of Fashion Design & Professional Study) Multan
 The Net Rider,(House of networking, Graphic Designing, Freelancing, Multan
 Institute of Modern Arts and Languages (IMAL 360), Multan
 Career Institute Pakistan, Multan
 Institute of Cost and Management Accountants of Pakistan (ICMA Pakistan), Multan
 Multan Homeopathic College and Hospital]], Multan
 Pakistan Vocational Training Centre, Multan
 The Ace International School System
 Ace School of Languages, 2-A Bosan Road, Multan, 0616221383

Medical and Dental Schools
 Bakhtawar Amin Medical College, Multan
 Bakhtawar Amin School of Nursing, Multan
 CMH Multan Institute of Medical Sciences (CIMS), Multan
 Multan Medical and Dental College, Multan
 Nishtar Institute of Dentistry, Multan
 Nishtar Medical College, Multan

Universities

 University of Education Lahore (Multan Campus)
 Muhammad Nawaz Sharif University of Agriculture, Jalalpur PirWala, Multan
 Muhammad Nawaz Sharif University of Engineering and Technology, Multan
 Air University Multan Campus, (AUMC) Islamabad, Pakistan Air Force
 Bahauddin Zakariya University, Multan
 Institute of Southern Punjab, Multan
 National College of Business Administration and Economics, Lahore (Sub Campus Multan Campus)
 National University of Modern Languages (NUML), Islamabad (Multan Campus)
 NFC Institute of Engineering and Technology, Multan
 University of Education, Lahore (Multan Campus)
 Virtual University of Pakistan, Lahore (Multan Campus)
 Women University Multan
 Usman Daud University Multan (UDU)
 Pakistan Institute of Engineering and Technology, Multan

Newly Established Universities (Government of Punjab Charted/PEC Visited twice)
 Muhammad Nawaz Sharif University of Engineering and Technology, Multan

See also
Higher Education Commission of Pakistan
Top 10 Schools in Multan for Matric

References

 01
Multan-related lists
Multan
 01
Multan